The 2022–23 season (officially known as Liga de Plata and also as Torneo Luis Baltazar Ramírez) will be El Salvador's Segunda División de Fútbol Salvadoreño. The season will be split into two championships Apertura 2022 and Clausura 2023. The champions of the Apertura and Clausura play the direct promotion playoff every year. The winner of that series ascends to Primera División de Fútbol de El Salvador.

Changes to the 2022–23 seasons

Teams promoted to 2022–23 Primera División de El Salvador
 Dragon

Teams relegated to Segunda División de Fútbol Salvadoreño  - Apertura 2022
 Municipal Limeno.

Teams relegated to Tercera Division de Fútbol Salvadoreño - Apertura 2022 
 AD Santa Rosa
 El Vencedor

Teams promoted from Tercera Division De Fútbol Salvadoreño - Apertura 2022
 A.D. Masahuat
 Club Deportivo Pipil

New Teams or teams that purchased a spot in the Segunda division
 Atletico Balboa (Purchased spot of Aspirante)

Teams that failed to register for the Apertura 2022
 Aspirante (Sold spot to Atlético Balboa)

Notable events

FESFUT removal and Games suspensions
On the 20th of July, The Governmental National Sports Institute (INDES) in association with the Attorney general raided Salvadoran Football Federation (FESFUT) in relation to money laundering and fraudulent administration. INDES issued an administrative resolution ordering the dismissal of FESFUT directors and the creation of a Normalizing Commission.

As a result of this internal crisis, All three main divisions games from round 2 to 4 were suspended due to referees not showing up.

FIFA  it could suspend El Salvador if its state-led sports institute removes the heads of the Salvadoran Football Federation (FESFUT) in favor of hand-picked officials, according to a letter shared by the federation online.

After a month and a half and with the imposition of a FIFA Regulation Committee in the FESFUT, plus the delivery of credentials by INDES, the second division obtained the green light to be able to resume their tournament, which was interrupted after a disputed date.

The Segunda Division announced September 1, 2022 that the season will resume the Apertura 2022 tournament on September 17, 2022. The final 2ill be played 14 January.

AD Juyua-Municipal
It was announced by club president due to high cost, minimal support and lack of sponsorship t, club would be selling their spot in Segunda division. On January, 2023 It was announced Nuevo Cuscatlán FC purchased the spot and they will participate in 2023 Clausura season. The club will move to Nuevo Cuscatlán and play at Estadio Municipal Florencia.

Clubs Failure to register for 2023 Clausura
Ilopango FC, Marte Soyapango and Real Atlético Sonsonate failed to register for 2023 Clausura season as all three owed unpaid salaries to players, coaching staff and the league.

Managerial changes

Before the start of the season

During the Apertura season

Between the Apertura and Clausura season

Clausura seasons

Apertura 2022

Teams

Only 20 teams chose to participate in this season championship.

Regular Seasons

Centro Oriente

Centro Occidente

Top scorers

Centro Oriente

Centro Occidente

Finals

Conference Quarter finals

Centro Oriente Conference

Real Destroyer won 3-1 on Aggregate

Titan won 6-1 on Aggregate

Centro Occidente Conference

Cacahuatique won 4-0 on Aggregate.

Fuerte San Francisco won 3-1 on Aggregate

Conference semifinals

Centro Oriente Conference

AD Destroyer won 4-2 on Aggregate

Centro Occidente Conference

Fuerte San Francisco won 4-3 on Aggregate

Grand final

Individual awards

Clausura 2023

Teams

Only 17 teams registered for the 2023 Clausura. 3 clubs (Ilopango FC, Marte Soyapango and Real Atlético Sonsonate) failed to register due lack of payments. AD Juayua sold their spot to Atlético Nacional Cuscatleco.

References

External links
 https://segundadivision.org/ (Official website)
 

Segunda División de Fútbol Salvadoreño seasons
2022–23 in Salvadoran football
EL Sal